Canthigaster cyanetron (commonly referred to as the blue-belly toby) is a species of pufferfish of the family Tetraodontidae. The species is endemic to Easter Island, and is an Endangered species due to coral reef bleaching of its habitat.

References

cyanetron
Fish described in 1989
Endemic fauna of Chile